Ravensbourne was a borough constituency in the London Borough of Bromley in south London. It returned one Member of Parliament (MP)  to the House of Commons of the Parliament of the United Kingdom by the first-past-the-post system. It existed from the February 1974 general election until it was abolished for the 1997 general election.

History
This was a safe Conservative seat held by Sir John Hunt for the entire period of its existence.

Boundaries 
1974–1983: The London Borough of Bromley wards of Bromley Common, Keston and Hayes, Martin's Hill and Town, West Wickham North, and West Wickham South.

1983–1997: The London Borough of Bromley wards of Biggin Hill, Bromley Common and Keston, Darwin, Hayes, Martins Hill and Town, West Wickham North, and West Wickham South.

Members of Parliament

Elections

Elections in the 1970s

Elections in the 1980s

Elections in the 1990s

See also
List of parliamentary constituencies in London

References 

Politics of the London Borough of Bromley
Parliamentary constituencies in London (historic)
Constituencies of the Parliament of the United Kingdom established in 1974
Constituencies of the Parliament of the United Kingdom disestablished in 1997